Delio Ramírez (born 17 February 1999), is a Colombian professional football player who plays as a midfielder for Deportivo Pereira.

References

External links

2000 births
Living people
Colombian footballers
Association football midfielders
Deportivo Pereira footballers
Categoría Primera A players